Conopinae is a subfamily of flies from the family Conopidae.

Tribes
Tribe Conopini
 Genus Conops Linnaeus, 1758
 Genus Leopoldius Rondani, 1843
Tribe Physocephalini
 Genus Physocephala Schiner, 1861
 Genus Physoconops  Szilady, 1926

References

Conopidae
Brachycera subfamilies